The 2013 President's Cup (Maldives) Final was the 63rd Final of the Maldives President's Cup.

Route to the final

Match

Details

See also
2013 President's Cup (Maldives)

References

President's Cup (Maldives) finals
Pres